Silicone Soul are a Scottish house music production duo from Glasgow. They have released five albums on Soma Quality Recordings, and manage their own record label called Darkroom Dubs. Their single release "Right On!" featuring Louise Claire Marshall entered various charts throughout Europe and reached number-one in the UK Dance Singles Chart in October 2001.

Discography

Albums
A Soul Thing (2000)
Staring into Space (2005)
Save Our Souls (2006)
Silicone Soul  (2009)
The Soma 20 Remixes (2012)

References

External links
Discography at discogs

Scottish house music groups
British house music duos
Scottish musical duos
Male musical duos
Musical groups from Glasgow